Kazimierz Lewandowski (28 March 1951 – 4 January 2022) was a Polish rower. He competed in the men's double sculls event at the 1972 Summer Olympics.

He died on 4 January 2022, at the age of 70.

References

External links
 

1951 births
2022 deaths
Polish male rowers
Olympic rowers of Poland
Rowers at the 1972 Summer Olympics
Sportspeople from Gdańsk